Wales International Film Festival (WalesIFF) is a film festival held in Gwyn Hall in Neath, Wales. It was founded in 2017 by Euros Jones-Evans and Samira Mohamed Ali.

References

External links
Official Website

Film festivals in Wales
British film awards
Awards established in 2017
2017 establishments in Wales
Annual events in Wales
Film festivals established in 2017